33 and a Third is the debut studio album by American record producer and rapper Def Dee. The album was released on July 23, 2013 by Mello Music Group. The album features guest appearances from Black Milk, The Black Opera, Boog Brown, Grynch, Hassaan Mackey, Jamall Bufford, John Robinson, Kenn Starr, Language Arts, Magestik Legend, Mic Phenom, OC Notes, Oddisee, Sydney Ranee, Tranqill, Uptown XO, Wise Intelligent, yU and Zar.

Track listing
All songs produced by Def Dee.

Personnel 
Credits for 33 and a Third adapted from AllMusic.

Def Dee – primary artist
Magestik Legend – featured artist
Jamall Bufford – featured artist
Hassaan Mackey – featured artist
yU – featured artist
John Robinson – featured artist
Boog Brown – featured artist
Black Milk – featured artist
Mic Phenom – featured artist
Language Arts – featured artist
Grynch – featured artist
Sydney Ranee – featured artist
Uptown XO – featured artist
Wise Intelligent – featured artist
Zar – featured artist
OC Notes – featured artist
Oddisee – featured artist
Tranqill – featured artist
The Black Opera – featured artist
Kenn Starr – featured artist
Michael Tolle – executive producer
Def Dee – producer
Eric Morgeson – mastering

References

External links
33 and a Third on Bandcamp 
33 and a Third at Discogs

2013 debut albums
Mello Music Group albums